Thomas Arthur Ponsonby, 3rd Baron Ponsonby of Shulbrede (23 October 1930 – 13 June 1990) was a British hereditary peer and Labour Party politician.

He was the eldest son of Matthew Henry Herbert Ponsonby, 2nd Baron Ponsonby of Shulbrede, and his wife Hon. Elizabeth Mary Bigham, daughter of  the 2nd Viscount Mersey. He was educated at Bryanston School and Hertford College, Oxford.

Political career
He served in London local government for 20 years, firstly as a council member of the Kensington and Chelsea council from 1956 to 1965 and then as an Alderman from 1964 to 1974. He then became an Alderman of Greater London Council from 1970 to 1977 and was elected Chairman of the Council from 1976 to 1977.

He succeeded to his title on the death of his father in 1976, and made his maiden speech in the House of Lords on the subject of local government devolution. He was elected Labour Chief Whip in the House of Lords in 1982, defeating Lord Strabolgi. He served as Opposition Chief Whip until his death in 1990.

He was a Governor of the London School of Economics from 1970 to 1990. He was also an active member of the Fabian Society, serving for a time as its general secretary.

Marriage and family
He had married twice: 
 firstly Ursula Mary Fox-Pitt, the daughter of Cdr Thomas Stanley Lane Fox-Pitt of Devon, with whom he had a son and three daughters, and 
 secondly Maureen Estelle Campbell-Teich, the widow of Dr Paul Campbell-Teich of Geneva, Switzerland.

He was succeeded by his son, Frederick Ponsonby, 4th Baron Ponsonby of Shulbrede.

References

1930 births
1990 deaths
Barons in the Peerage of the United Kingdom
Thomas
Members of London County Council
Labour Party (UK) councillors
Labour Party (UK) hereditary peers
Councillors in the Royal Borough of Kensington and Chelsea
General Secretaries of the Fabian Society
People educated at Bryanston School
Alumni of Hertford College, Oxford